You Must Be Kidding is a crime thriller novel by English author James Hadley Chase, published in 1979.

Synopsis
Insurance executive Ken Brandon breaks his marital vows when he becomes infatuated with his secretary.  However, Brandon soon realizes that he is in trouble when he comes across a murder. 

Investigating officer Tom Lepski takes the case and is sure that Brandon committed the crime. But then things get murkier, because more murders take place.

References

1979 British novels
Novels by James Hadley Chase
English thriller novels
Robert Hale books